South Garland Transit Center is a bus-only station located on the  I-635 (LBJ Freeway) service road.  The South Garland Transit Center is in the parking lot with the Cinemark Hollywood USA Movies 15 Theater . In Southern Garland, Texas (U.S.A.). It is owned and operated by Dallas Area Rapid Transit.

External links
Dallas Area Rapid Transit - South Garland Transit Center

https://www.dart.org/about/history.asp

Dallas Area Rapid Transit
Transportation in Garland, Texas
Bus stations in Texas